Emilio Cantu (May 10, 1926 - Apr 13, 2017) was an American politician and engineer in the state of Washington. He served in the Washington House of Representatives and Washington State Senate as a Republican. Before his time in the legislature, he had a long career with Boeing as an Engineering Design Manager. He graduated from the University of Texas at Austin with a Bachelor of Science degree and was a veteran of the United States Navy.

Career
During Cantu's career with Boeing, he designed the shelter structures used for transporting the Saturn V components along the interstate.

References

2017 deaths
Republican Party Washington (state) state senators
Republican Party members of the Washington House of Representatives
1926 births